Sanjeewan Priyadharshana (born 13 April 1997) is a Sri Lankan cricketer. He made his List A debut for Kurunegala Youth Cricket Club in the 2018–19 Premier Limited Overs Tournament on 8 March 2019. He made his first-class debut for Kurunegala Youth Cricket Club in Tier B of the 2018–19 Premier League Tournament on 21 March 2019. He made his Twenty20 debut on 4 January 2020, for Kurunegala Youth Cricket Club in the 2019–20 SLC Twenty20 Tournament.

References

External links
 

1997 births
Living people
Sri Lankan cricketers
Kurunegala Youth Cricket Club cricketers
Place of birth missing (living people)